The Belle Game, aka Belle Game, was an indie pop band originating from Vancouver, British Columbia and active from 2009 to 2020. Its members were Adam Nanji (guitar), Andrea Lo (lead vocals), and Katrina Jones (keyboards, vocals). Drummer Rob Chursinoff  left in 2014; drummer and guitarist Alex Andrew left in 2018. For a short time, bassist Ian Cook and trumpeter Andrew Lee were also part of the band. The name is a play on the literal translation, from German, of Glockenspiel.

History
In the summer of 2009, Andrea Lo, Alex Andrew and Adam Nanji got together to play a single performance at Vancouver's Railway Club. Lo and Nanji had grown up together and played as a duo before; Nanji and Andrew were at McGill University together. As a trio, they saw their potential as a team, added Cook, Lee and former Tegan and Sara drummer Rob Chursinoff and started writing. Their EP The Inventing Letters, was released in late 2009. The EP was well-received. It got regular airplay on CBC radio, the song "Tiny Fires" was chosen as Song of the Day by The Province newspaper, and won the Fan Favorite award on CHLG-FM/Shore 104.3FM's Summer Search. The video for "Shoulders & Turns" earned them a feature spot on MuchMusic’s The Wedge. In July 2011, they were part of Summer Live, the festival celebrating Vancouver's 125th birthday. 

In 2011, they released their second EP, Sleep to Grow, which was co-produced by David Carswell. and placed in the top-20 for the funding program, the Peak Performance Project. They opened for Gotye, Karkwa and Said the Whale, played the Squamish Valley Music Festival and, in 2011 and 2012, played the Rifflandia Music Festival and were selected to travel across Canada with Tracks on Tracks, a recording project of Green Couch Sessions, CBC Radio and Via Rail.

Ritual Tradition Habit (2013-2014)
The band continued writing and produced a complete album's worth of material; on the advice of Carswell, it was scrapped. They started again, "tried harder", released a 7" vinyl record of the single "Wait Up for You", and, in April 2013, released their debut album Ritual Tradition Habit. Ritual Tradition Habit earned many positive reviews, with Pitchfork giving it a rating of 7.2. “Wait Up For You” was put into rotation on the Vancouver station the Peak 102.7 FM as well as other radio stations across the country. Pitchfork posted "River" as 'Best New Track',  and Rolling Stone chose "Blame Fiction" as the track of the day.

The music video for “River” was put into rotation on MuchMusic. It was nominated for the 2014 Prism Prize, and, after making it into the top ten list, won the Audience Award.Pitchfork Media also posted about the music video for “River”.

The band attended the Banff Centre for Arts and Creativity's Indie Music Residency in October 2013, where they were mentored by Kevin Drew of Broken Social Scene. They then embarked on their first headlining North American and European tours for 5 weeks and 4 weeks, respectively. They played South by Southwest, Ottawa's CityFolk Festival, and opened for Half Moon Run, Hannah Georgas, Bahamas and Born Ruffians. In November 2013, tour mates Bear Mountain and The Darcys opened for The Belle Game when they headlined at Vancouver's Vogue Theatre. 

In September 2013, The Belle Game's song "Tradition" appeared on the season premiere of Grey’s Anatomy. "River" appeared on the UK TV series Misfits, and "Blame Fiction" was used in the series Orphan Black.

Fear/Nothing (2015-2018)
In 2015, the band dropped the 'The' from their name. In February 2015, they traveled to Montreal to record their second studio album with producers Kevin Drew and Dave Hamelin (The Stills). They were dropped by their label Boompa; eventually they signed with Arts & Crafts and Fear/Nothing was released on September 8, 2017. In the interim, they played the WayHome Music & Arts Festival and the Vancouver Folk Music Festival,  then went on a tour of North America and Europe.

In January 2018, they released the additional single "Only One"; in June, the additional singles, "Follow". At this point, they were back to being a trio--Nanji, Lo and Jones.

In the spring of 2018, Belle Game went on tour with Broken Social Scene. In October 2018, the band supported ex-Smiths guitarist Johnny Marr on the US leg of his tour in support of his third studio album, Call the Comet.

In 2019, director Kevan Funk won the Prism Prize for Canadian Music Video of the Year for Belle Game's video Low.

By 2020, the band's website and Facebook page had been taken down. There was no accompanying announcement of their break-up.

Discography

Albums
Ritual Tradition Habit (2013), Boompa
Fear/Nothing (2017), Arts & Crafts

EPs
Inventing Letters EP (2009)
Sleep to Grow EP (2011), Independent

Singles
"Wait Up for You" (2013)
"Only One" (2018)
"Follow" (2018)

See also
Canadian rock
List of bands from British Columbia
List of bands from Canada

References

External links 
  (defunct)
 Official Twitter

Canadian indie pop groups
Musical groups established in 2009
Musical groups from Vancouver
2009 establishments in British Columbia